Pine Grove Cemetery can refer to:
(sorted by state, then city/town)

 Pine Grove Cemetery (Leominster, Massachusetts), listed on the National Register of Historic Places (NRHP) in Worcester County
 Pine Grove Cemetery (Lynn, Massachusetts)
 Pine Grove Cemetery (Truro, Massachusetts), listed on the NRHP in Barnstable County